This is a list of airports in the Caribbean, sorted by location.

The following categories contain lists of all Caribbean airports with Wikipedia articles:

 :Category:Airports in Anguilla
 :Category:Airports in Bermuda
 :Category:Airports in Saint Vincent and the Grenadines

Some Caribbean airports without articles can be found in the following manually maintained lists:



Anguilla

Aruba

Barbados

Bermuda

Caribbean Netherlands

Cuba

Montserrat

Saint Martin (island)

Saint Vincent and the Grenadines

Trinidad and Tobago

Comparisons 
 List of Airport Service Quality Award winners#Latin America & Caribbean
 List of largest airlines in Central America & the Caribbean
 List of accidents and incidents involving airliners by location
 List of the busiest airports in the Caribbean
 World's busiest airports by passenger traffic
 List of busiest airports in Latin America by passenger traffic
 List of the busiest airports in Central America
 List of the busiest airports in the Nordic countries
 List of the busiest airports in Europe
 World's busiest airports by cargo traffic

See also 
Airports Council International - Latin America-Caribbean, industry group collectively representing North America's airports
List of airports

References

 
Caribbean
Airports